Aisha Rocek (born 29 December 1998) is an Italian female rower bronze medal winner at senior level at the European Rowing Championships. She competed at the 2020 Summer Olympics, in Pair.

References

External links
 

1998 births
Living people
Italian female rowers
Rowers of Centro Sportivo Carabinieri
Rowers at the 2020 Summer Olympics